VRB may refer to:
The IATA code for Vero Beach Regional Airport
A 'variable' state in METAR weather reports
Vanadium redox battery
Vodka Red Bull